This is a list of the known wild biota of the Isle of Man.

Non-native species are marked *, extinct species are marked †. If this status is uncertain the species is also marked ?.

Each listing follows the following format: English name (where one exists), binomial/trinomial scientific name with authorities for uncommon species, Manx name (where one exists), status.

Amphibia (amphibians)

Salamandridae (salamanders and newts) 
Great crested newt, Triturus cristatus *
Smooth newt, Triturus vulgaris *
Palmate newt, Triturus helveticus *

Anura (frogs and toads) 
Common toad, Bufo bufo *
Common frog, Rana temporaria

Aves (birds)

Gaviidae (divers) 
Red-throated diver, Gavia stellata
Black-throated diver, Gavia arctica
Great northern diver, Gavia immer

Podicipedidae (grebes) 
Little grebe, Tachybaptus ruficollis
Slavonian grebe, Podiceps auritus

Hydrobatidae (petrels) 
Storm petrel, Hydrobates pelagicus

Procellariidae (shearwaters) 
Manx shearwater, Puffinus puffinus
Fulmar, Fulmarus glacialis

Sulidae (gannets and boobies) 
Gannet, Morus bassanus

Phalacrocoracidae (cormorants) 
Cormorant, Phalacrocorax carbo (Fannag)
Shag, Phalacrocorax aristotelis

Ardeidae (egrets and herons) 
Bittern, Botaurus stellaris†
Grey heron, Ardea cinerea

Anatidae (swans, geese and ducks) 
Mute swan, Cygnus olor 
Whooper swan, Cygnus cygnus
Pink-footed goose, Anser brachyrynchus
Greylag goose, Anser anser
Canada goose, Branta canadensis *
Brent goose, Branta bernicla
Shelduck, Tadorna tadorna
Wigeon, Anas penelope
Gadwall, Anas strepera
Teal, Anas crecca
Mallard, Anus platyrhynchos
Shoveler, Anas clypeata
Pochard, Aythya ferina
Tufted duck, Aythya fuligula
Scaup, Aythya marila
Eider, Somateria mollissima
Long-tailed duck, Clangula hyemalis
Common scoter, Melanitta nigra
Velvet scoter, Melanitta fusca
Goldeneye, Bucephala clangula
Red-breasted merganser, Mergus serrator
Goosander, Mergus merganser
Ruddy duck, Oxyura jamaicensis †*

Accipitridae (hawks, eagles, kites and harriers) 
Sparrowhawk, Accipiter nisus
Hen harrier, Circus cyaneus
White-tailed eagle, Haliaeetus albicilla†

Falconidae (falcons) 
Kestrel, Falco tinnunculus
Merlin, Falco columbarius
Peregrine, Falco peregrinus

Phasianidae (partridges and quail) 
Red-legged partridge, Alectoris rufa *
Grey partridge, Perdix perdix †*
Quail, Coturnix coturnix

Tetraonidae (grouse) 
Black grouse, Tetrao tetrix† (extinct, native status uncertain but an introduced population is extinct)
Red grouse, Lagopus lagopus scoticus† (native, extinct by 1835, reintroduced 1880 and still extant) (Kellagh Ruy /  – Heath Hen).

Phasianidae (pheasants) 
Pheasant, Phasianus colchicus *

Rallidae (rails and crakes) 
Water rail, Rallus aquaticus
Corncrake, Crex crex†
Coot, Fulica atra

Haematopodidae (oystercatchers) 
Oystercatcher, Haematopus ostralegus

Scolopacidae (waders) 
Curlew, Numenius arguata

Scolopacidae (woodcock and snipe) 
Woodcock, Scolopax rusticola
Snipe, Gallinago gallinago

Laridae (gulls) 
Herring gull, Larsus argentatus
Great black-backed gull, Larsus marinus

Alcidae (auks) 
Great auk, Pinguinus impennis†
Puffin, Fratercula arctica
Razorbill, Alca torda

Columbidae (pigeons) 
Woodpigeon, Columba palumbus
Collared dove, Streptopelia decaocto

Tytonidae (barn owls) 
Barn owl, Tyto alba

Strigidae (other owls) 
Tawny owl, Strix aluco† (bred once)
Long-eared owl, Asio otus
Short-eared owl, Asio flammeus

Hirundinidae (swallows) 
Swallow, Hirundo rustica

Motacillidae (wagtails) 
Grey wagtail, Motacilla cinerea
Pied wagtail, Motacilla alba yarrellii

Troglodytidae (wrens) 
Wren, Troglodytes troglodytes

Prunellidae (dunnock) 
Dunnock, Prunella modularis

Turdidae (thrushes) 
Robin, Erithacus rubecula
Blackbird, Turdus merula
Song thrush, Turdus philomelos

Sylviidae (warblers) 
Willow warbler, Phylloscopus trochilus
Goldcrest, Regulus regulus

Paridae (tits) 
Blue tit, Parus caeruleus
Great tit, Parus major
Coal tit, Parus ater
Long-tailed tit, Aegithalos caudatus

Sturnidae (starlings) 
Starling, Sturnus vulgaris

Corvidae (corvids) 
Magpie, Pica pica
Jackdaw, Corvus monedula
Raven, Corvus corax
Carrion crow, Corvus corax
Hooded crow, Corvus cornix
Chough, Phyrocorrax phyrocorrax
Rook, Corvus frugilegus

Passeridae (sparrows) 
House sparrow, Passer domesticus

Fringillidae (finches) 
Common chaffinch, Fringilla coelebs
Goldfinch, Carduelis chloris
Greenfinch, Carduelis chloris

Emberizidae (buntings) 
Corn bunting, Miliaria calandra†

Insecta (insects)

Neuroptera (lacewings) 
Chrysops vulgaris
Chrysops ventralis
Hemerobius lutescens
Micromus veriegatus

Trichoptera (caddisflies)
Limnophilus auricula
Limnophilus flavicornis
Limnophilus elegans

Odonata (dragonflies and damselflies) 
Updated August 2022
Common hawker, Aeshna juncea
Brown hawker, Aeshna grandis
Migrant hawker, Aeshna mixta - recent arrival, thought to be breeding (2022) at around 7 sites
Common darter, Sympetrum striolatum
Black darter, Sympetrum danae - possibly endangered by drier springs drying out its upland pools
Red-veined darter, Sympetrum fonscolombi
Ruddy darter, Sympetrum sanguineum
Four-spotted chaser, Libellula quadrimaculata
Black-tailed skimmer, Orthetrum cancellatum  - single, photographed record
Emperor dragonfly, Anax imperator - recent arrival
Lesser emperor dragonfly, Anax parthenope - recent arrival
Vagrant emperor dragonfly, Anax ephippiger
Common blue damselfly, Enallagma cyathigerum
Blue-tailed damselfly, Ischnura elegans
Large red damselfly, Pyrrhosoma nymphula
Emerald damselfly, Lestes sponsa
Azure damselfly, Coenagrion puella  - possibly extinct, recorded in just two years from Poyll Dhooie, Ramsey.

Orthoptera (grasshoppers and crickets) 
Dark bush-cricket, Pholidoptera griseoaptera - Found only on the Lonan coast and around the Glen Maye ASSI - protected under Schedule 5 of the Wildlife Act 1990
Speckled bush-cricket, Leptophyes punctatissima - Found only along south coast, including Glen Chass, Port St. Mary and in the west at Glen Maye ASSI - protected under Schedule 5 of the Wildlife Act 1990
Lesser mottled grasshopper, Stenobothrus stigmaticus - Found only on the Langness ASSI, the only locality in the British Isles - protected under Schedule 5 of the Wildlife Act 1990
Common green grasshopper, Omocestus viridulus - common
Mottled grasshopper, Myrmeleotettix maculatus
Field grasshopper, Chorthippus brunneus
Common ground-hopper, Tetrix undulata

Dermaptera (earwigs) 
Common earwig, Forficula auricularia

Dictyoptera (cochroaches)

Phasmida (stick-insects)

Diptera (true flies) 
Bibio marci
Bibio reticulatus
Bombylius canescens
Bombylius minor, heath bee-fly, a protected species. Current (2022) British Isles distribution seems to be limited to the Dorset heaths and the north coast of the Isle of Man at The Ayres, The Phurt (Ramsey) and The Lhen
Calliphora vomitoria
Cheilosia rosarum
Machimus cowini, Manx robber fly

Coleoptera (beetles)

Hymenoptera (bees, wasps and ants) 
Agrothereutes abbreviata
Andrena clarkella
Andrena denticulata
Andrena labilis
Bombus agrorum
Bombus lucorum
Bombus muscorum
Crabo cribarius
Dolerus liogaster
Dolerus cothurnatus
Halictus calceatus
Lissonata bellator
Myrmica ruginodis
Parabates cristatus
Pontania viminalis
Psythyrus campestris
Spilichneumon occisorius
Trichoma enecator

Lepidoptera (butterflies and moths) 
As of 2023 the Isle of Man has 20 regularly occurring migrant and resident species of butterfly, with a total of 23 all-time records in the wild.

Pieridae (whites) 
Large white, Pieris brassicae (fairly common resident)
Small white, Pieris rapae (common resident)
Green-veined white, Pieris napi (common resident)
Orange tip, Anthocharis cardamines (fairly common resident)
Clouded yellow, Colias croceus (irregular migrant - an immigration year occurring in 1947. 107 records of NBN Atlas Isle of Man as of May 2022)
Brimstone, Gonepteryx rhamni (very rare migrant)

Lycaenidae (blues and coppers) 
Small copper, Lycaena phlaeas (common resident)
Common blue, Polyommatus icarus (common resident)
Holly blue, Celastrina argiolus (fairly common and widespread resident)

Satyridae (browns) 
Grayling, Hipparchia semele (residential restricted to grassy, rocky cliffs and The Ayres - 355 records of NBN Atlas Isle of Man as of May 2022)
Speckled wood, Pararge aegeria (recent coloniser, since 2005, now very common and widespread)
Meadow brown, Maniola jurtina (common and widespread resident)
Wall, Lasiommata megera (relatively common and widespread but in reduced number)
Small heath, Coenonympha pamphilus (common and widespread, particularly on rabbit-grazed coastal grassland an in uplands)

Nymphalidae (fritillaries and aristocrats) 
Dark green fritillary, Speyeria aglaja (widespread but local resident)
Red admiral, Vanessa atalanta (common annual migrant)
Small tortoiseshell, Aglais urticae (widespread and common, but declining)
Peacock, Aglais io (fairly common resident)
Comma, Polygonia c-album (fairly recent coloniser, since 1990s, local, mainly in north - rare)
Painted lady, Vanessa cardui (annual migrant)
Ringlet, Aphantopus hyperantus (extremely rare vagrant - NBN Atlas Isle of Man contains only a single record from 1937 in Peel)
Scotch argus, Erebia aethiops (extremely rare vagrant)
Monarch butterfly, Danaus plexippus (extremely rare vagrant - 4 records of NBN Atlas Isle of Man as of May 2022)

Crambidae  (grass moths) 
Scarce Crimson and Gold moth, Pyrausta sanguinalis, a small distinctively marked moth, dark yellow with crimson bands across the forewings merging with crimson edging. It is scarce and local in the British Isles and appears to be confined to areas of Northern Ireland, the Burren in the Republic of Ireland and the Isle of Man. Here, it is only found along the northern coast at The Ayres National Nature Reserve, where its larvae live in silken tubes and feed on the flowers of wild thyme growing in the former sand pits. At The Ayres adults fly during the day mostly in June but have been recorded in July and into early August. The species was once more widespread in Britain but has declined in recent years and is thought to be extinct in its former range in north-west England and Scotland.

Arctiidae (woolly worm moths) 
Cinnabar moth, Tyria jacobaeae

Geometridae (geometers) 
Peppered moth, Biston betularia
Garden carpet, Xanthorhoe fluctuata 
Silver ground carpet, Xanthorhoe montanata montanata

Sphingidae (hawkmoths) 
Elephant hawkmoth, Deilephila elpenor
Death's head hawkmoth, Acherontia atropos

Notodontidae (prominent moths) 
Puss moth, Cerura vinula

Noctuidae (noctuids) 
Silver Y, Autographa gamma f. gammina
Ingrailed clay, Diarsia mendica mendica

Hemiptera (true bugs) 
Acanthosoma haemorrhoidale (Hawthorn shield bug)
Capsus meriopterus (a broom myrid)
Corixa praeusta (a water boatman)
Herris lacustris (common pondskater)
Hydrometra stagnorum (water-measurer)
Myzus cerasi
Peizodorus lituratus
Plagiognathus arbustorum
Sybsigara fossarum
Subsigara scotti
Velua currens

Mammalia (mammals)

Chiroptera (bats) 
As of 2020 research by the Manx Bat Group has found that there are at least nine species of Chiroptera found on the Isle of Man:
Common pipistrelle, Pipistrellus pipistrellus
Whiskered bat, Myotis mystacinus
Natterer's bat, Myotis nattereri
Daubenton's bat, Myotis daubentonii
Leisler's bat, Nyctalus leisleri (first recorded in 1990)
Soprano pipistrelle, Pipistrellus pygmaeus
Brown long-eared bat, Plecotus auritus
Nathusius's pipistrelle, Pipistrellus nathusii 
Lesser horseshoe bat, Rhinolophus hipposideros

Lagomorpha (rabbits and hares) 
Mountain hare, Lepus timidus †* (once extinct but now reintroduced, found only on the Northern Hills)
European hare, Lepus europaeus * (uncertain if introduced, found locally across the Isle of Man but not the Calf of Man)
European rabbit, Oryctolagus cuniculus * (found across the Island and on the Calf of Man in good numbers)

Insectivora (insect-eaters) 
European hedgehog, Erinaceus europaeus *(accidental introduction) *
Pygmy shrew, Sorex minutus (the common shrew is not found in the Isle of Man as commonly thought)

Rodentia (rodents) 
Wood mouse, Apodemus sylvaticus
House mouse, Mus domesticus *
Brown rat, Rattus norvegicus *

Carnivora (carnivores) 
Stoat, Mustela erminea hibernica (known as a 'weasel' in the Manx English dialect)
Ferret, Mustela furo (known as polecats but really just feral ferrets)

Cervidae (deer) 
Irish elk, Megaloceros giganteus †

Pinnipedia (seals and walruses) 
Grey seal, Halichoerus grypus
Common seal, Phoca vitulina (occasional, not known to breed)

Artiodactyla (even-toed ungulates or hoofed mammals) 
Domestic goat, Capra hircus *

Marsupialia (marsupials) 
Red-necked wallaby, Macropus rufogriseus *

Cetacea (whales and dolphins) 
Note that Manx nomenclature traditionally did not differentiate between species. Most whales are known as '' (sea pigs) or '' and small dolphins as ''.

Regularly seen species 
Harbour porpoise, Phocoena phocoena
Bottlenose dolphin, Tursiops truncates
Common dolphin, Delphinus delphis
Risso's dolphin, Grampus griseus
Minke whale, Balaenoptera acutorostrata

Rarely seen species 
Humpback whale, Megaptera novaeangliae
Killer whale, Orcinus orca
Fin whale, Balaenoptera physalus
White-beaked dolphin, Lagenorhynchus albirostris (filmed off Fort Island on 14 August 2022)

Vagrant species 
Sei whale, Balaenoptera borealis – a single adult was stranded on Langness in May 1925. Its skeleton is on display in the Natural History Gallery of the Manx Museum
Long-finned pilot whale, Globicephala melas – no known records in Manx waters, but have been sighted in the Irish Sea
Striped dolphin, Stenella coeruleoalba - on 20 December 2017 a single striped dolphin beached and died in Castletown harbour and was preserved for display within the Manx Museum

Extinct populations 
Grey whale, Eschrichtius robustus – a coastal whale probably once found in the Irish Sea, however the species' North Atlantic population was extirpated in the 18th century.

Domestic animals 
All sorts of domesticated species have been brought to the Isle of Man by humans over the millennia. Two notable landrace breeds have evolved distinctively on the island:
 Manx cat, a domestic cat (Felis catus) with genetic abbreviation of the tail, which may range from no tail at all to essentially full-size. Developed as a standardised breed in the late 19th century, the Manx cat has become a popular breed worldwide, but is in danger of disappearing on the island itself, as it is being out-bred by other cats imported over the last century by primarily English immigrants. The long-haired variety is called the Cymric cat in some breed registries, and was primarily developed in Canada, not the Isle of Man.
 Manx Loaghtan, a variety of domestic sheep (Ovis aries) with brown wool and four horns, rare outside the island and considered "at risk" by the Rare Breeds Survival Trust.

Mollusca (molluscs) 
Aplexa hypnorum
Carychium minimum
Columella edentula
Stagnicola palustris
Radix peregra
Galba truncatula
Physa fontinalis
Pisidium hibernicum
Pisidium milium
Pisidium nitidum
Pisidium obtusale
Pisidium pusillum
Pisidium subtruncatum
Gyraulus albus
Bathyomphalus contortus
Anisus spirorbis
Punctum pygmaeum
Sphaerium corneum
Valvata piscinalis
Vertigo antivertigo
Anodonta anatina (duck mussel)

Gastropoda (gastropods)

Stylommatophora (common land snails and slugs) 
Limax cinereoniger (ash-black slug) found in remnant ancient woodland in 2011 after not being recorded for over 100 years.

Order Trochida 
Jujubinus striatus (grooved topshell) recorded in the Langness Marine Nature Reserve in 2019; the first Manx record since Edward Forbes recorded it in 1838.

Reptilia (reptiles) 
Common lizard, Zootoca vivipara

Chondrichthyes (cartilagenous fish) 
Basking shark, Cetorhinus maximus

Lamprey 
Brook lamprey, ‘’Lampetra planeri’’ 
River lamprey, ‘’Lampetra fluviatilis’’ 
Sea lamprey, ‘’Petromyzon marinus’’

Osteichthyes (bony fish) 
Brown trout, Salmo trutta including the anadromous form, the sea trout
Rainbow trout, Oncorhynchus mykiss *
Atlantic salmon, Salmo salar
Ocean sunfish, Mola mola (recent vagrant)
Swordfish, Xiphias gladius (rare vagrant, single record on 27 August 2022)
European eel, ‘’Anguilla anguilla’’
Minnow, ‘’Phoxinus phoxinus’’ 
Three-spined stickleback, ‘’Gasterosteus aculeatus’’ 
Nine-spined stickleback, ‘’Pungitius pungitius’’

Arthropoda (arthropods) 
The format here is common English name (if one exists), followed by scientific name, followed by authority in brackets. There are no Manx names.

Anostraca

Chirocephalidae 
Fairy Shrimp, Chirocephalus diaphanus

Arachnida (spiders) 
218 species of Arachnids have been identified in the Isle of Man as of 1 January 2002.

Pholcidae 
Pholcus phalangioides (Fuesslin)

Segestriidae 
Segestria senoculata (Linnaeus)

Dysderidae 
Dysdera erythrina (Walckenaer)
Dysdera crocata (C.L. Koch)
Harpactea hombergi (Scopoli)

Oonopidae 
Oonops pulcher Templeton

Mimetidae 
Ero cambridgei (Kulczynski)
Ero furcata (Villers)

Nesticidae 
 Nesticus cellulanus (Clerck)

Theridiidae 
Episinus angulatus (Blackwall)
Dipoena inornata (O.P.-Cambridge)
Steatoda phalerata (Panzer)
Steatoda bipunctata (Linnaeus)
Theridion sisyphium (Clerck)
Theridion melanurum (Hahn)
Theridion mystaceum (L. Koch)
Paidiscura pallens (Blackwall)
Enoplognatha ovata (Clerck)
Enoplognatha thoracica (Hahn)
Robertus lividus (Blackwall)
Robertus arundineti (O.P.-Cambridge)
Pholcomma gibbum (Westring)

Linyphiidae 
Ceratinella brevipes (Westring)
Ceratinella brevis (Wider)
Ceratinella scabrosa (O.P.-Cambridge)
Walckenaeria acuminata (Blackwall)
Walckenaeria antica (Wider)
Walckenaeria nodosa (O.P.-Cambridge)
Walckenaeria nudipalpis (Westring)
Walckenaeria monoceros (Wider)
Walckenaeria unicornis (O.P.-Cambridge)
Walckenaeria kochi (O.P.-Cambridge)
Walckenaeria cuspidata (Blackwall)
Walckenaeria vigilax (Blackwall)
Dicymbium nigrum (Blackwall)
Dicymbium brevisetosum Locket
Dicymbium tibiale (Blackwall)
Entelecara erythropus (Westring)
Gnathonarium dentatum (Wider)
Gongylidium rufipes (Sundevall)
Dismodicus bifrons (Blackwall)
Hypomma bituberculatum (Wider)
Hypomma cornutum (Blackwall)
Metopobactrus prominulus (O.P.-Cambridge)
Baryphyma trifrons (O.P.-Cambridge)
Gonatium rubens (Blackwall)
Gonatium rubellum (Blackwall)
Maso sundevalli (Westring)
Peponocranium ludicrum (O.P.-Cambridge)
Pocadicnemis pumila (Blackwall)
Pocadicnemis juncea Locket & Millidge
Oedothorax gibbosus (Blackwall)
Oedothorax fuscus (Blackwall)
Oedothorax agrestis (Blackwall)
Oedothorax retusus (Westring)
Oedothorax apicatus (Blackwall)
Trichopterna thorelli (Westring)
Pelecopsis mengei (Simon)
Pelecopsis parallela (Wider)
Silometopus ambiguus (O.P.-Cambridge)
Silometopus elegans (O.P.-Cambridge)
Cnephalocotes obscurus (Blackwall)
Tiso vagans (Blackwall)
Tapinocyba praecox (O.P.-Cambridge)
Tapinocyba pallens (O.P.-Cambridge)
Monocephalus fuscipes (Blackwall)
Monocephalus castenipes (Simon)
Lophomma punctatum (Blackwall)
Gongylidiellum vivum (O.P.-Cambridge)
Micrargus subaequalis (Westring)
Micrargus herbigradus (Blackwall)
Erigonella hiemalis (Blackwall)
Savignia frontata (Blackwall)
Diplocephalus cristatus (Blackwall)
Diplocephalus permixtus (O.P.-Cambridge)
Diplocephalus latifrons (Blackwall)
Diplocephalus picinus (Blackwall)
Araeoncus humilis (Blackwall)
Araeoncus crassiceps (Westring)
Erigone dentipalpis (Wider)
Erigone atra (Blackwall)
Erigone promiscua (O.P.-Cambridge)
Erigone arctica (White)
Erigone longipalpis (Sundevall)
Drepanotylus uncatus (O.P.-Cambridge
Leptothrix hardyi (Blackwall)
Hilaira excisa (O.P.-Cambridge)
Halorates reprobus (O.P.-Cambridge)
Ostearius melanopygius (O.P.-Cambridge)
Porrhomma pygmaeum (Blackwall)
Porrhomma convexum (Westring)
Agyneta subtilis (O.P.-Cambridge)
Agyneta conigera (O.P.-Cambridge)
Agyneta decora (O.P.-Cambridge)
Agyneta cauta (O.P.-Cambridge)
Agyneta olivacea (Emerton)
Agyneta ramosa Jackson
Meioneta rurestris (C.L. Koch)
Meioneta saxatilis (Blackwall)
Microneta viaria (Blackwall)
Centromerus sylvaticus (Blackwall)
Centromerus prudens (O.P.-Cambridge)
Tallusia experta (O.P.-Cambridge)
Centromerita bicolor (Blackwall)
Centromerita concinna (Thorell)
Saaristoa abnormis (Blackwall)
Bathyphantes approximatus (O.P.-Cambridge)
Bathyphantes gracilis (Blackwall)
Bathyphantes parvulus (Westring)
Bathyphantes nigrinus (Westring)
Kaestneria pullata (O.P.-Cambridge)
Diplostyla concolor (Wider)
Poeciloneta variegata (Blackwall)
Drapetisca socialis (Sundevall)
Tapinopa longidens (Wider)
Floronia bucculenta (Clerck)
Taranucnus setosus (O.P.-Cambridge)
Labulla thoracica (Wider)
Stemonyphantes lineatus (Linnaeus)
Bolyphantes luteolus (Blackwall)
Lepthyphantes leprosus (Ohlert)
Lepthyphantes minutus (Blackwall)
Lepthyphantes alacris (Blackwall)
Lepthyphantes obscurus (Blackwall)
Lepthyphantes tenuis (Blackwall)
Lepthyphantes zimmermanni Bertkau
Lepthyphantes mengei (Kulczynski)
Lepthyphantes flavipes (Blackwall)
Lepthyphantes tenebricola (Wider)
Lepthyphantes ericaeus (Blackwall)
Linyphia triangularis (Clerck)
Neriene montana (Clerck)
Neriene clathrata (Sundevall)
Neriene peltata (Wider)
Microlinyphia pusilla (Sundevall)
Allomengea scopigera (Grube)

Tetragnathidae 
Tetragnatha extensa (Linnaeus)
Tetragnatha montana (Simon)
Pachygnatha clercki (Sundevall)
Pachygnatha degeeri (Sundevall)
Metellina segmentata (Clerck)
Metellina mengei (Blackwall)
Metellina merianae (Scopoli)
European cave spider Meta menardi (Latreille)

Araneidae 
European garden spider Araneus diadematus (Clerck)
Araneus quadratus (Clerck)
Larinioides cornutus (Clerck)
Nuctenea umbratica (Clerck)
Araniella cucurbitina (Clerck)
Araniella opisthographa (Kulczynski)
Zygiella x-notata (Clerck)
Zygiella atrica (C.L. Koch)

Lycosidae 
Pardosa monticola (Clerck)
Pardosa palustris (Linnaeus)
Pardosa pullata (Clerck)
Pardosa prativaga (L. Koch)
Pardosa amentata (Clerck)
Pardosa nigriceps (Thorell)
Alopecosa pulverulenta (Clerck)
Trochosa ruricola (Degeer)
Trochosa terricola Thorell
Arctosa perita (Latreille)
Arctosa leopardus (Sundevall)
Pirata piraticus (Clerck)
Pirata latitans (Blackwall)
Pirata piscatorius (Clerck)

Pisauridae 
Nursery web spider Pisaura mirabilis (Clerck)

Agelenidae 
Agelena labyrinthica (Clerck)
Textrix denticulata (Olivier)
Giant house spider Tegenaria gigantea (Chamberlin & Ivie)
Tegenaria saeva (Blackwall)
Domestic house spider Tegenaria domestica (Clerck) (Mx. Doo-oallee)

Cybaeidae 
Water spider Argyroneta aquatica (Clerck)

Hahniidae 
Antistea elegans (Blackwall)
Hahnia montana (Blackwall)
Hahnia nava (Blackwall)

Dictynidae 
Dictyna arundinacea (Linnaeus)
Dictyna latens (Fabricius)

Amaurobiidae 
Amaurobius fenestralis (Stroem)
Amaurobius similis (Blackwall)
Amaurobius ferox (Blackwall)
Coelotes atropos (Walckenaer)

Liocranidae 
Agroeca proxima (O.P.-Cambridge)
Scotina gracilipes (Blackwall)
Phrurolithus festivus (C.L. Koch)

Clubionidae 
Clubiona reclusa (O.P.-Cambridge)
Clubiona stagnatilis (Kulczynski)
Clubiona pallidula (Clerck)
Clubiona phragmitis (C.L. Koch)
Clubiona terrestris (Westring)
Clubiona neglecta (O.P.-Cambridge)
Clubiona lutescens (Westring)
Clubiona comta (C.L. Koch)
Clubiona trivialis (C.L. Koch)
Clubiona diversa (O.P.-Cambridge)

Gnaphosidae 
Drassodes lapidosus (Walckenaer)
Drassodes cupreus (Blackwall)
Haplodrassus signifer (C.L. Koch)
Scotophaeus blackwalli (Thorell)
Zelotes latreillei (Simon)
Zelotes apricorum (L. Koch)
Drassyllus lutetianus (L. Koch)
Drassyllus pusillus (C.L. Koch)
Micaria pulicaria (Sundevall)

Philodromidae 
Philodromus aureolus (Clerck)
Philodromus cespitum (Walckenaer)
Tibellus maritimus (Menge)

Thomisidae 
Xysticus cristatus (Clerck)
Xysticus kochi (Thorell)
Xysticus erraticus (Blackwall)
Ozyptila sanctuaria (O.P.-Cambridge)
Ozyptila trux (Blackwall)
Ozyptila atomaria (Panzer)

Salticidae 
Zebra spider Salticus scenicus (Clerck)
Heliophanus cupreus (Walckenaer)
Pseudoeuophrys frontalis (Walckenaer)
Euophrys lanigera (Simon)
Sitticus saltator (Simon)

Pinophyta (conifers)

Cupressaceae (cypresses) 
Common juniper, Juniperus communis

Magnoliopsida 
Agrimony, Agrimonia eupatoria
Alpine clubmoss, Diphasiastrum alpinum
Beech fern, Phegopteris connectilis
Blunt-leaved pondweed, Potamogeton obtusifolius
Brackish water crowfoot, Ranunculus baudotii
Burnet saxifrage, Pimpinella saxifraga
Carline thistle, Carlina vulgaris
Celery-leaved buttercup, Ranunculus sceleratus
Common bladderwort, Utricularia vulgaris
Common cow-wheat, Melampyrum pratense
Common sea lavender, Limonium vulgare
Common skullcap,  Scutellaria galericulata - rediscovered on 4 July 2022 after an absence of records for 142 years.
Common wintergreen, Pyrola minor
Cranberry, Vaccinium oxycoccos
Dioecious sedge, Carex dioica
Dodder, Cuscuta epithymum
Dune fescue, Vulpia fasciculata
Eelgrass, Zostera marina
Fennel pondweed, Potamogeton pectinatus
Few-flowered spike rush, Eleocharis quinqueflora
Field gentian, Gentianella campestris
Floating burr-reed, Sparganium natans
Floating club-rush, Eleogiton fluitans
Grass-leaved orache, Atriplex littoralis
Greater broomrape, Orobanche rapum-genistae
Greater spearwort, Ranunculus lingua
Hare's-foot clover, Trifolium arvense
Hay-scented buckler-fern, Dryopteris aemula
Horned pondweed, Zannichellia palustris
Iceland cress, Rorippa islandica
Ivy-leaved bellflower, Wahlenbergia hederacea
Killarney filmy fern, Trichomanes speciosum
Least willow, Salix herbacea
Lesser clubmoss, Selaginella selaginoides
Lesser tussock-sedge, Carex diandra
Lesser twayblade, Neottia cordata
Lesser water-plantain, Baldellia ranunculoides
Maidenhair fern, Adiantum capillus-veneris
Marsh hawk's-beard, Crepis paludosa
Marsh stitchwort, Stellaria palustris
Mountain pansy, Viola lutea
Narrow buckler-fern, Dryopteris carthusiana
Narrow-leaved water-plantain, Alisma lanceolatum
Nodding bur-marigold, Bidens cernua
Oyster plant, Mertensia maritima
Pale butterwort, Pinguicula lusitanica
Pale sedge, Carex pallescens
Parsley fern, Cryptogramma crispa
Parsley water-dropwort, Oenanthe lachenalii
Pennyroyal, Mentha pulegium
Pillwort, Pilularia globulifera
Pink water speedwell, Veronica catenata
Portland spurge, Euphorbia portlandica
Rock sea lavender, Limonium binervosum agg.
Saltmarsh flat-sedge, Blysmus rufus
Sea purslane, Atriplex portulacoides
Sea wormwood, Seriphidium maritimum
Shepherd's cress, Teesdalia nudicaulis
Slender spike-rush, Eleocharis uniglumis
Smooth cat's-ear, Hypochaeris glabra
Spring sandwort, Minuartia verna
Stagshorn club moss, Lycopodium clavatum
Strawberry clover, Trifolium fragiferum
Tubular water-dropwort, Oenanthe fistulosa
Viper's bugloss, Echium vulgare
Western clover, Trifolium occidentale
White sedge, Carex curta
Wilson's filmy fern, Hymenophyllum wilsonii
Wood fescue, Festuca altissima
Wood melick, Melica uniflora
Wood small-reed, Calamagrostis epigejos
Wood speedwell, Veronica montana
Wood vetch, Vicia sylvatica

Brassicales 
Isle of Man cabbage, Coincya Monensis. In 2019 was recorded in two locations at the Ayres National Nature Reserve.

Nymphaeaceae (waterlilies) 
Yellow water lily, Nuphar lutea

Mycetozoa (slime moulds)
Anopodium ampullaceum
Sporormia fimetaria

Fungi 

As of September 2022, 1801 distinct species from the Kingdom Fungi have been recorded on NBN Atlas Isle of Man.

Hymenoscyphus fraxineus ash dieback fungus (previously known as Chalara fraxinea). First identified on Great Britain in 2012 and the Isle of Man in 2017. Since then the fungus has rapidly spread throughout the island.

Strophariaceae (dung fungi) 
Sixty-two species of dung fungi have been recorded in the Isle of Man as of 13 April 2009 by Michael J. Richardson, a British mycologist. The following are from a sample of rabbit (Oryctolagus cuniculus) pellets collected at The Ayres on 6 January 2008.

Ascomycetes

Pezizales
Coprotus sexdecimsporus
Iodophanus carneus

Thelebolales
Thelebolus polysporus

Helotiales
Unguiculella tityrii

Sordariales
Arnium mendax
Bombardioidea stercoris
Coniochaeta hansenii
Podospora pleiospora
Schizothecium tetrasporum
Schizothecium vesticola

Microascales
Viennotidia fimicola

Pleosporales
Delitschia winteri
Sporormiella australis
Sporormiella grandispora
Sporormiella intermedia
Trichodelitschia minuta

Basidiomycetes

Agaricales
Coprinus miser
Coprinus stercoreus

Zygomycetes

Mucorales
Pilaira moreaui

Myxomycetes
Didymium difforme

References

 
Environment of the Isle of Man